Bobby Kaufmann (born 1985) is the Iowa State Representative from the 73rd District. A Republican, he has served in the Iowa House of Representatives since 2013. 

In 2023, Kaufmann was appointed as a senior advisor on Donald Trump's 2024 presidential campaign in the Iowa caucuses.

Political career 
Kaufmann first ran for office in 2012, winning election to the 73rd District seat previously held by his father Jeff Kaufmann.

Arrests 
His February 2012 arrest and guilty plea for public intoxication became a campaign issue.  He received a deferred judgment, and the charge was removed from his record after completing probation.  Kaufmann's arrest led to the revelation that Kaufmann had at least 17 citations and arrests, mostly for traffic-related issues.

LGBT Controversy 
Kaufmann ignited controversy by using his position as Chair of the Iowa House Government Oversight Committee to launch an investigation into an LGBT youth conference in Iowa.  After controversy arose over his investigation, Kaufmann claims he read blogs or received an email alleging that Kauffman was a homosexual himself.  In reaction, Kaufmann testified before the Iowa House Government Oversight Committee that he was not in a homosexual relationship with colleague Greg Heartsill, stating "I am here to announce that Rep. Heartsill and I are not in a homosexual relationship."

"Suck it Up Buttercup" Bill 
Following the 2016 presidential election, Kaufmann announced that he planned to introduce a bill in the January legislative session that would penalize state universities that used public funding to offer election-related counseling and other support services to students that are beyond the scope of existing mental health resources. 

The bill, which Kaufmann nicknamed the "Suck it up, Buttercup" bill, would cut the budget of state universities by double the amount they spend on such activities and introduce criminal penalties for protesters that block highways. 

In an interview with Fox & Friends on November 16, Kaufmann claimed that there were post-election "cry rooms" and that he "was hearing reports of some schools that were bringing in ponies to be able get students through the election." These claims were untrue.  When pressed for more details on these reports of coddling students during a live interview later that day with the Canadian radio show As It Happens, Kaufmann hung up and accused the program of having an agenda.

Voting Legislation 
In 2021, Kaufmann proposed legislation in the Iowa House of Representatives to restrict voting rights in Iowa. Kaufmann has promoted false claims of voter fraud.

Electoral history 
Kaufmann was elected in 2012, defeating Democrat Dick Schwab; he was reelected in 2014 over challenger David Johnson.

Kaufmann was re-elected in 2014, 2016, 2018, and 2020.

Presidential politics 
Kaufmann supported Marco Rubio's presidential candidacy in the 2016 Republican primary. In 2023, Kaufmann was hired by Donald Trump's 2024 presidential campaign to serve as a senior advisor for the Iowa caucuses.

Family 
Kaufmann is the son of former Iowa State Representative and current Republican Party of Iowa chairman Jeff Kaufmann and Vicki Wing Kaufmann.  He has two brothers: Jacob and John. He also had a brother that was stillborn. He is a self-employed entrepreneur in demolition and hauling.

References

External links 

Bobby Kaufmann official Iowa General Assembly site
Profile at Iowa House Republicans

1985 births
Farmers from Iowa
Living people
Republican Party members of the Iowa House of Representatives
People from Wilton, Iowa
University of Iowa alumni
21st-century American politicians
Donald Trump 2024 presidential campaign